Glaphyrorhynchus is an extinct genus of teleosaurid thalattosuchian from the Middle Jurassic (Aalenian) of southern Germany.

Taxonomy and provenance
Glaphyrorhynchus is known only from a jaw fragment found in the late Aalenian of Aalen, Germany. The holotype is lost, so the validity of the taxon remains unclear.

References

Prehistoric pseudosuchian genera
Prehistoric marine crocodylomorphs
Middle Jurassic crocodylomorphs
Jurassic reptiles of Europe
Fossils of Germany
Fossil taxa described in 1842